The Fishery Railway Hortobágy (Hungarian: Hortobágy-halastavi Kisvasút) is a narrow gauge railway with a gauge of  at the fish ponds near Hortobágy in Hungary. It is the only fishery railway in Europe that operates with locomotives.

History 
The railway was built and commissioned in 1915. Formerly steam and diesel locomotives moved trains with fish food from the silo in Hortobágyi-Halastó at the standard gauge railway lint to the fish ponds, which had been built in the 19th century. In the other direction they transported freshly caught fish. The railway was temporarily decommissioned in 1960. All goods are now transported by lorries.

Since 2007, the railway is used as a tourist train. A one-way trip lasts 23 min.

Rolling stock
There are two diesel locomotives of the type C-50 and a decommissioned MV Kuli. Three passenger cars have been built on the trucks of four wheel goods wagons. In 2006 a larger four wheel passenger car was built. In addition there are some well-worn goods wagons.

Photos

References 

760 mm gauge railways in Hungary